Aowin Constituency is one of the constituencies represented in the Parliament of Ghana. It elects one Member of Parliament (MP) by the first past the post system of election. Aowin is located in the Aowin district of the Western North Region of Ghana.

See also
List of Ghana Parliament constituencies

References 

Parliamentary constituencies in the Western North Region